Killyloch is a malt whisky which was distilled at the Glenflagler  Malt Distillery and was first distilled and bonded in February 1965.  

Glenflagler Malt Distillery was a historic "Lowland" malt distillery and was closed and demolished by Inver House Distillers Limited in July 1985. The whisky was produced mainly as a filling for blends and was never officially bottled as a single malt. However, there was once instance of a 36-year-old released by Inver House in 2003. Very little of Killyloch's liquid remains in existence. In the 2010s, a bottle of 36-year-old Killyloch 1967 Limited Edition sold on an online auction for £1,550.

The name Killyloch is a corruption of a local loch, Lillyloch and is believed to have occurred as a result of an incorrect stencil being used to mark the early barrels.

Killyloch™ first used in commerce 18 December 1964 and initially trademark by Continental Distilling Corporation on a registration date of 24 May 1966.  Currently is under a trademark 494039800079 and copyright VA00181898 by Veni-Vidi-Vici LLC.

References

External links 
 Whisky Magazine entry 
 www.killyloch.com

Scottish malt whisky
Products introduced in 1965